Al-Ghazzi is a prominent family based in Damascus. It was best known for producing noted ulema and other scholars and the leadership of the Shafi'i madhhab (school of jurisprudence) in Damascus during late Mamluk (1260–1517) and Ottoman rule (1517–1918). Toward the end of Ottoman rule, throughout French rule (1920–1946) and following Syria's independence in 1946 several members of the family held political office, including at the national level, and as prominent professionals and journalists.

Origins
The Ghazzi family historically claimed descent from the Banu Amir ibn Lu'ayy clan of the Quraysh tribe of the Islamic prophet Muhammad, hence their frequent use of the nisba al-Amiri al-Qurashi. The family moved from Gaza, hence the family's name al-Ghazzi to Damascus in 1348 under its head al-Shihab Ahmad ibn Abdullah ibn Badr. Ahmad became a prominent member of the city's Shafi'i ulema as well as an instructor in a number of madrasas (schools) and administrator of several waqfs (endowments).

Leaders of the Shafi'is of Damascus
The descendants of Ahmad followed him in the engagement of Islamic scholarship. His grandson Radi al-Din Muhammad (1458–1529) was the deputy qadi (judge) of the Shafi'is and an important figure in the Sufi Qadiriyya order in the late 15th and early 16th century, during the ending years of Mamluk rule and the beginnings of Ottoman rule. He had lost his position at some point before or during the political transition, but regained it by developing close ties with the Ottoman government. He penned works about Sufism, aqida (creed), agriculture and plants, medicine, and Arabic grammar.

Radi al-Din's son Badr al-Din, born in 1499, received an elite education in the Mamluk capital Cairo, including instruction by al-Suyuti. He started his career as a scholar in Damascus around 1515. He eventually became the Shafi'i mufti of Damascus and an instructor in the Umayyad Mosque. He wrote one of the first Arabic travel accounts of Constantinople, the Ottoman capital, and the places along the way, called al-Matali al-badriyya fi al-manazil al-Rumiyya (Full Moon Rising: Waystations to Constantinople) during his visit in 1530–1531. By the time of his death in 1577 he had become among the preeminent scholars of Damascus, best known for his tafsirs (interpretations of Islamic scripture) and his fatwas (legal opinions).

Badr al-Din's son Najm al-Din penned a substantial dictionary of biographies of Syrian, as well as Egyptian and other Ottoman, notables of the 16th and 17th centuries. His grandnephew Shams al-Din (d. 1754), the Shafi'i mufti, also penned an extensive collection of biographies, though much broader in scope. Some fourteen members of the family are mentioned among the leading ulema of Damascus by the local 18th-century historian Khalil al-Muradi.

Notable members
 Najm al-Din al-Ghazzi (d. 1651, Ottoman-era scholar of Damascus)
 Fawzi al-Ghazzi
 Nadia al-Ghazzi
 Said al-Ghazzi

Notes

References

Bibliography

Al-Ghazzi family
Syrian families
Political families of Syria
People from Damascus